Maria Holm Peters (born 16 September 1999) is a Danish ice hockey player and member of the Danish national ice hockey team, currently playing with the Odense IK Kvinder of the KvindeLigaen.

Holm Peters represented Denmark at the IIHF Women's World Championship Division I Group A tournaments in 2016, 2017, 2018, and 2019, and at the Top Division tournament in 2021. She tallied her first senior national team goal at the qualification tournament for the 2022 Winter Olympics, scoring the game winner in a match against . As a junior player with the Danish national under-18 team, she participated in the Division I Qualification tournament of the IIHF Women's U18 World Championship in 2015, the Division I tournament in 2016, and the Division I Group B tournaments in 2017 and 2018.

References

External links
 

Living people
1999 births
Sportspeople from Odense
Danish women's ice hockey forwards
Danish ice hockey left wingers
Leksands IF Dam players
Danish expatriate ice hockey people
Danish expatriate sportspeople in Sweden
Expatriate ice hockey players in Sweden
Ice hockey players at the 2022 Winter Olympics
Olympic ice hockey players of Denmark